Galium arenarium or sand bedstraw is a plant species of the genus Galium.  It grows on beaches and sand dunes along the Atlantic coast of western France and northern Spain.

Taxonomy
The species was described by Jean-Louis-Auguste Loiseleur-Deslongchamps in 1828.

References

External links
Tela Botanica
Atlas y Libro Rojo de la Flora Vascular Amenazada de España
Gaillet des Sables, Liboupat

arenarium
Flora of Spain
Flora of France
Plants described in 1828